Surgical Neurology International is a bimonthly peer-reviewed open access medical journal that was established in 2010 and is published by Medknow Publications. It publishes original articles, review articles, case reports, technical notes, and editorials regarding developments in the field of neurosurgery and related clinical and basic neurosciences. The editor-in-chief is James I. Ausman (University of California, Los Angeles).

History 
Surgical Neurology International was established in April 2010 by James I. Ausman, the longtime and last editor of Surgical Neurology.

Abstracting and indexing 
The journal is abstracted and indexed in Pubmed Central and Scopus.

Supplements 
The journal regularly publishes supplements organized around a common theme. Recent issues have covered neurooncology, new developments in neurosurgery, stereotactic techniques, spine, neurovascular, neuro-nursing, and pediatric neurosurgery.

Collaborations 
The journal  collaborates with the Asociación Argentina de Neurocirugía, Sociedade Brasileira de Neurocirurgía, Sociedad Neurocirugía de Chile, Asociación Colombiana de Neurocirugía, Pakistan Society of Neurosurgeons, Federación Latinoamericana de Sociedades de Neurocirugía, and the Sociedad Española de Neurocirugía. Collaboration is also maintained with the following journals:  Brazilian Neurosurgery, Neurocirugía Hoy, and the Russian Neurosurgical Journal.

References

External links 
 

Neurology journals
Surgery journals
English-language journals
Open access journals
Bimonthly journals
Publications established in 2010
Medknow Publications academic journals